Viktor Valentinovich Chistiakov (born February 9, 1975, in Moscow) is a Russian pole vaulter. He competed for a period for Australia.

Born the same year as Dmitri Markov, Chistiakov won the 1994 World Junior Championships when Markov placed second. The roles were reversed at the European Indoor Championships.

Chistiakov moved to Australia with his then-wife Tatiana Grigorieva and became an Australian citizen. His personal best is 5.90 metres, and his best Olympic performance was in 2000 when he finished fifth. He is the son of Olympic medalist Natalya Pechonkina.

In mid-2006 he declared he was transferring back to Russia. The move was finalized on 12 February 2007.

International competitions

See also
List of eligibility transfers in athletics

References

External links
 
 
 
 

1975 births
Living people
Athletes from Moscow
Australian male pole vaulters
Russian male pole vaulters
Olympic male pole vaulters
Olympic athletes of Russia
Olympic athletes of Australia
Athletes (track and field) at the 1996 Summer Olympics
Athletes (track and field) at the 2000 Summer Olympics
World Athletics Championships athletes for Australia
World Athletics U20 Championships winners
Russian Athletics Championships winners
Australian Athletics Championships winners
Russian emigrants to Australia
Athletes (track and field) at the 2002 Commonwealth Games
Commonwealth Games competitors for Australia